Streptomyces xanthophaeus is a bacterium species from the genus of Streptomyces which has been isolated from soil. Streptomyces xanthophaeus produces geomycin, arginylthreonine and diadzein.

See also 
 List of Streptomyces species

References

Further reading

External links
Type strain of Streptomyces xanthophaeus at BacDive – the Bacterial Diversity Metadatabase

xanthophaeus
Bacteria described in 1952